"Let the Little Girl Dance" is a song written by Carl Spencer and Henry Glover and performed by Billy Bland.  It reached #7 on the U.S. pop chart, #11 on the U.S. R&B chart, and #15 on the UK Singles Chart in 1960.

The song ranked #51 on Billboard magazine's Top 100 singles of 1960.

Other versions
Ernest Tubb, as the B-side to his 1960 single "Everybody's Somebody's Fool".
Toni Williams, featuring The Tremellos, as a single in 1960 in New Zealand. It did not chart.
Grantley Dee, as a single in 1966 in Australia; it charted #2 Melbourne #3 Brisbane and #1 Perth.
Hopeton Lewis, as a single in 1967 in the UK, but it did not chart.
A rendering by Jackie Robinson was released on the 1998 compilation album Get on Up!: Joe Gibbs Rocksteady.

References

1960 songs
1960 singles
1967 singles
Songs written by Henry Glover
Ernest Tubb songs
Island Records singles